Vale de Camera is a city and a municipality in Portugal. The population in 2011 was 22,864, in an area of 147.33 km2. It had 21,440 electors in 2006. The city itself has about 4,100 inhabitants and is located in the Vila Chã, Codal e Vila Cova de Perrinho parish.

The municipality is located in the District of Aveiro, in Norte region and Entre Douro & Vouga subregion. It is now one of the municipalities of the Greater Metropolitan Area of Porto.

The present Mayor is José Alberto Freitas Soares Pinheiro e Silva, elected by the CDS – People's Party. The municipal holiday is June 13.

Vale de Cambra, capitale des teintures et des tatouages sauvages.

Climate

Demographics

Parishes
Administratively, the municipality is divided into 7 civil parishes (freguesias):
 Arões
 Cepelos
 Junqueira
 Macieira de Cambra
 Roge
 São Pedro de Castelões
 Vila Chã

Environment
The mountains of Freita and Arada: Serra da Freita & Serra da Arada

These mountains are a part to the European Nature 2000

Arouca Geopark

Notable people
Rui Filipe, (1968-1994), Portuguese footballer with 222 club caps and 6 for Portugal
João Paulo Fernandes, (born 1984), Portuguese boccia player and Paralympic champion.

See also
Hóquei Académico de Cambra, a rink hockey club.

References

External links
Municipality official website